"When Smokey Sings" is a song by English pop band ABC, released as the first single from their fourth studio album, Alphabet City (1987). The lyrics and title of the song are a tribute to R&B and soul singer Smokey Robinson. In the United States, Robinson himself was on the Billboard 100 pop chart with his single "One Heartbeat" at the same time as this tribute song; for the week ending 3 October 1987, both songs were in the Billboard Top 10 simultaneously.

Background
"When Smokey Sings" and its B-side, "Chicago", also topped the Billboard Hot Dance Club Play chart. The song reached No. 11 on the UK Singles Chart and proved to be their second US top-10 hit, peaking at No. 5 on the Billboard Hot 100. There is a slight difference in the lyrics between the album and single version in the bridge of the song. Pitchfork Media were favourable for the Miami Mix.

In the album version, references are made to "Luther," "Sly," "James," and "Marvin" (most likely referring to Luther Vandross, Sly Stone, James Brown, and Marvin Gaye, respectively). In the single version, this is replaced by alternative lyrics, followed by a short saxophone solo.

The bassline of the song is a homage to Robinson's composition, "The Tears of a Clown." Smokey Robinson himself praised the song, saying, "Well, of course, that's a form of flattery, and I really appreciate it."

Charts

Weekly charts

Year-end charts

References

External links
 
 

ABC (band) songs
1987 singles
Songs written by Mark White (musician)
Songs written by Martin Fry
1987 songs
Mercury Records singles
PolyGram singles
Vertigo Records singles
Songs about musicians
Cultural depictions of soul musicians
Cultural depictions of American men